Chris Hill (born August 8, 1983) is an American former professional basketball player who has played in Liga II, the Lithuanian Basketball League and the Baltic Basketball League.  He also played for NCAA Division I's University of Wisconsin–Milwaukee Panthers.

Amateur career
He was a member of the Milwaukee Panthers men's team that won the Horizon League regular season championship three consecutive years from 2004 to 2006 and won back-to-back Horizon League men's basketball tournaments in 2005 and 2006. He was a member of the team that made the sweet sixteen for the first time in school history at the 2005 NCAA Men's Division I Basketball Tournament, leading the team in assists in each of its three games.

In high school, he led Whitney Young High School to a second place Chicago Public League finish. He was a four-year starter at Whitney Young.

Pro career
He has played professionally for CS Otopeni of Liga II (2006–07) and BC Techasas of Lithuanian Basketball League and the Baltic Basketball League (2008–09).

Notes

External links
Chris Hill Stats, Bio - ESPN
UW-Milwaukee profile

1983 births
Living people
American expatriate basketball people in Lithuania
American expatriate basketball people in Romania
American expatriate basketball people in Ukraine
American men's basketball players
Basketball players from Chicago
BC Cherkaski Mavpy players
BC Odesa players
Milwaukee Panthers men's basketball players
Point guards